Gursky may refer to:
 Andreas Gursky, a German photographer
 Herbert Gursky, researcher in the area of x-ray astronomy
 Solomon Gursky Was Here, a novel by Mordecai Richler published 1989